The First Swedish Crusade was a mythical military expedition in the 1150s to Southwestern Finland by Swedish King Eric IX and English Bishop Henry of Uppsala.

Earliest written sources of the crusade are from the late 13th century. The main sources of the crusade, the legend of Saint Erik and the legend of Saint Henry, describe the crusade as caused by the multiple raids of pagan Finns on Sweden.

The crusade has traditionally been seen as the first attempt of the Catholic Church and Sweden to convert pagan Finns to Christianity. However, the Christianisation of Southwestern Finland is known to have already started in 10th century, and in the 12th century, the area was probably almost entirely Christian. According to legends, after the crusade, Bishop Henry was killed at Lake Köyliönjärvi by Lalli. Henry later became a central figure of the Catholic Church in Finland.

Veracity of the crusade 
Academics debate whether this crusade actually took place. No archaeological data gives any support for it, and the earliest written sources are from much later. No surviving written source describes Swedish influence in Finland before the end of the 13th Century. Furthermore, the diocese and the bishop of Finland are not listed among their Swedish counterparts before the 1250s. Also, the Christianisation of south-western Finland is known to have already started in the 10th century, and in the 12th century, the area was probably almost entirely Christian.

The Swedish bishop who was normally involved in the eastern campaigns was the Bishop of Linköping, not the Bishop of Uppsala.

The mid-12th century was a very violent time in the northern Baltic Sea, with Finnish tribes such as Tavastians and Karelians as well as Swedes in frequent conflicts with Novgorod and with one another. The First Novgorod Chronicle tells that in 1142 a Swedish "prince" and bishop, accompanied by a fleet of 60 ships, plundered just three Novgorodian merchant vessels somewhere "on the other side of the sea", obviously after something more important.

Timing of the crusade 
Almost every year of the 1150s has been suggested as the year that the crusade possibly took place. The most widely-supported years have been 1150, 1155, 1157 and 1158. Other candidates have been 1153, 1154 and 1156.

At the time, leading the leiðangr was the responsibility of the jarl. That gave rise to a theory that Eric had conducted the expedition before he became king or pretender to the throne. Legends give no year for the expedition, but all attempts to date it to an exact year in the 1150s have been much later speculations. All that is known about King Eric and Bishop Henry is that they most probably held important positions in Sweden at some time during the mid-12th century.

See also 
 Second Swedish Crusade
 Third Swedish Crusade
 Northern Crusades
 Bishop Fulco

References 

12th century in Sweden
Finland under Swedish rule
Northern Crusades